Lin Ta (born 31 January 1963) is a Chinese International Master chess player. 

He was a member of the Chinese national chess team, he was also a member of the national team at the Chess Olympiad four times in 1984-1990. Lin played a total of 28 games scoring 13 wins, 9 draws and 6 losses.

Lin competed twice at the World Men's Team Chess Championship (1985–1989) having played a total 10 games (2 wins, 6 draws, 2 losses); and once at the Asian Men's Team Chess Championship (1987) having played 7 games (5 wins, 2 draws, 0 losses).

His current (inactive) ELO rating is 2372 according to FIDE.

See also
Chess in China

References

External links

1963 births
Living people
Chinese chess players
Chess International Masters